My Chubby World is a 2011 Philippine television informative children's show broadcast by GMA Network. Hosted by Renz Valerio, Daniella Amable, Gianna Cutler and Zyrael Jestre, it premiered on May 14, 2011. The show concluded on August 11, 2012 with a total of 26 episodes.

Overview
The program showcased children's love for playing, creating, performing and discovering things about the world. Every episode, it gives a fun countdown of things and activities that children are interested in.

Every episode, the hosts enumerate Top 7 things that kids like for the topic or theme of the week—be it children's favorite sports, pets, earth-friendly habits, entertainment and more.

Directed by Don Michael Perez, the program helps kids be updated with the latest and coolest stuff. It also guides parents through things that get their children enthusiastic and all fired up.

During its second season in 2012 (adding the subtitle Big Adventure), the show reformats from being a straight educational program into an educational challenge race where every week, there are two kiddie contestants representing a school from Metro Manila. The contestants must accomplish the three stages of challenges (physical, mental and immersion challenge) and find the hidden Chubby. The winner will be awarded a cash prize as well as the represented school.

The second season was directed by Noel Añonuevo.

Hosts
Renz Valerio
Daniella Amable
Gianna Cutler
Zyrael Jestre

Ratings
According to AGB Nielsen Philippines' Mega Manila household television ratings, the final episode of My Chubby World scored a 2.7% rating.

Accolades

References

External links
 

2011 Philippine television series debuts
2012 Philippine television series endings
Filipino-language television shows
GMA Network original programming
Philippine children's television series